Tamzin Maria Outhwaite (born 5 November 1970) is an English actress, presenter and narrator. Since playing the role of Mel Owen in the BBC soap opera EastEnders, she has starred in a number of theatre and television productions, including army series Red Cap and crime drama New Tricks.

Early life
The only daughter of Anna (née Santi) and Colin Frank Outhwaite, born in Ilford, Essex, Outhwaite has two younger brothers, Kes and Jake. She was educated at Trinity Catholic High School, Woodford Green. Her mother is of Italian heritage. Her maternal great grandfather Adelmo Santi and his eldest son Pietro Santi were born in Barga, Italy, and became naturalised British citizens in 1957, living first in Glasgow, Scotland, and then settling in Fishburn, England running an ice cream business.

Outhwaite attended the Stagestruck Theatre Company as a teenager, taking part in several productions during the mid-1980s. While at school, she studied part-time at Sylvia Young Theatre School and on leaving school in 1987, she joined the London Studio Centre to study drama and dance.

Career

Early career and EastEnders
On graduation from the London Studio Centre she started her career in the theatre, taking roles in productions including Grease and Oliver!, and work at the Stephen Joseph Theatre, before landing bit parts in television series The Bill and Men Behaving Badly.

She found national fame in 1998 when she was cast as Mel Healy in the popular BBC soap opera EastEnders. Her first appearance was aired in October 1998 and her final one was in April 2002. During nearly four years in Walford, Outhwaite's character was central to many storylines. Outhwaite left EastEnders in 2002, shortly after the departure from the soap of co-star Martin Kemp, who had played her on-screen husband Steve Owen.

She stated in 2006 that she would not rule out returning to EastEnders and her return was confirmed on 24 October 2017. Outhwaite departed the soap for a second and final time in November 2019, when Mel was killed off.

Further work
In 2007, Outhwaite appeared in a revival of Boeing Boeing at the Comedy Theatre, as well as the film Cassandra's Dream, which first premiered in June. In March 2008, she had a role in the ITV drama series The Fixer. In 2009, she played the lead in the sci-fi crime series for the BBC entitled Paradox, which first aired on BBC One on 24 November 2009. In 2010, she appeared in Over the Rainbow, a talent show casting for Andrew Lloyd Webber's stage production of The Wizard of Oz. That same year, she was a member of the judging panel on the UK television programme Don't Stop Believing broadcast on Channel 5.

In July 2013, Outhwaite joined the cast of the popular BBC One comedy-drama series New Tricks as DCI Sasha Miller, replacing Amanda Redman as head of the team in the show. Outhwaite had earlier appeared in series 9, episode 6 of the show, guest-starring as a different character who is brought to justice at the end of the episode. In March 2016, Outhwaite was cast to play Teresa Phillips in a revival of Alan Ayckbourn's How the Other Half Loves at the Theatre Royal, Haymarket. Outhwaite has done introductory segments of true crime episodes of NBC's Dateline for British television audiences. In May 2020, Outhwaite played Indie Hendricks in Dun Breedin, a project by Julie Graham about women who are going through the menopause during lockdown due to the COVID-19 pandemic. Because of this, her scenes were filmed at her own house. The episodes were uploaded to YouTube weekly.

In 2021, Outhwaite appeared on The Masked Dancer, masked as Scarecrow. She was unmasked in the final and finished in fourth place.

Personal life
Outhwaite resides in London. From 2006 to 2014, she was married to Welsh actor Tom Ellis, with whom she has two children. It was announced in 2013 that the pair had separated and that Outhwaite had filed for divorce which was finalised in April 2014.

Outhwaite is cousin to Holly Willoughby's husband, Dan Baldwin.

Outwaite acts as an ambassador for the Park Theatre in the Finsbury Park area of London.

Filmography

Awards and nominations

References

External links

 

1970 births
20th-century English actresses
21st-century English actresses
Alumni of the Sylvia Young Theatre School
English film actresses
English musical theatre actresses
English television actresses
English people of Italian descent
English stage actresses
English soap opera actresses
Living people
People from Ilford